Bon Homme Hutterite Colony, located in Bon Homme County, South Dakota, is the mother colony of all Schmiedeleut Hutterite Colonies in North America and also the oldest Hutterite Colony in the world still in existence. 

It was founded in 1874 by Hutterite immigrants from what is today Ukraine under the leadership of Michael Waldner (1834–1889), who reestablished communal living among the Hutterites in Hutterdorf, Ukraine, in 1859. It was the only Hutterite Colony that did not relocate to Canada after World War I.

Bon Homme Hutterite Colony in 2012 belonged to the more conservative Committee Hutterites, also called  Schmiedeleut 2.

See also
National Register of Historic Places listings in Bon Homme County, South Dakota
Bon Homme Colony, South Dakota, census-designated place covering the colony

References 

Geography of Bon Homme County, South Dakota
German-Russian culture in South Dakota
Hutterite communities in the United States
National Register of Historic Places in South Dakota
Populated places established in 1874
1874 establishments in Dakota Territory